The rivière aux Graines (English: Seed River) is a tributary of the Gulf of Saint Lawrence, flowing in the municipality of L'Île-d'Anticosti, in the Minganie Regional County Municipality, in the administrative region of North Shore, in province of Quebec, in Canada.

A network of secondary forest roads serves this small valley and is linked to the road which runs along the southern coast of the island.

Forestry is the main economic activity in this area.

Geography 
The rivière aux Graines draws its source from a marsh area located in the western part of Anticosti Island.

From its source, the river flows south between La Petite Rivière (located on the west side) and the Bec-Scie River (located on the east side).

Toponymy 
The toponymic designation appeared in 1955 on a geographic map used by the Consolidated Bathurst logging company. This toponym was made official on December 5, 1968, at the Bank of place names of the Commission de toponymie du Québec.

See also 

 List of rivers of Quebec

References 

Rivers of Côte-Nord
Anticosti Island
Minganie Regional County Municipality